The Museum of Curiosity is a comedy talk show on BBC Radio 4 that was first broadcast on 20 February 2008. It is hosted by John Lloyd (Professor of Ignorance at the University of Buckingham, and later at Solent University). He acts as the head of the (fictional) titular museum, while a panel of three guests – typically a comedian, an author and an academic – each donate to the museum an 'object' that fascinates them. The radio medium ensures that the suggested exhibits can be absolutely anything, limited only by the guests' imaginations.

Each series has had a different co-host, under the title of curator of the museum. Bill Bailey acted as co-host of the programme in the first series, before leaving the show after deciding to "retire" from panel games. Sean Lock, Jon Richardson, Dave Gorman, Jimmy Carr, Humphrey Ker, Phill Jupitus, Sarah Millican, Noel Fielding, Jo Brand, Romesh Ranganathan, Sally Phillips, Lee Mack, Bridget Christie, Alice Levine and Holly Walsh have all assumed the role for a series. Gorman also stood in for Richardson for one episode of the third series, after Richardson was stranded due to the eruption of Eyjafjallajökull. Ker also functioned as a stand-in, this time for Jimmy Carr, when Carr was unable to attend one episode in series 5.

The programme has often been compared to the television panel game QI. Both were co-created by Lloyd, several of the Museum's 'curators' and comic guests have appeared regularly on QI, and the QI Elves (QI's research team, who provide hosts Stephen Fry and Sandi Toksvig with live information as required during the programme) provide the research. As a result, some critics consider the radio show to be a spin-off of the TV programme, and some have further ventured that The Museum of Curiosity is not as good as its forerunner. Most reviews of The Museum of Curiosity, however, are positive.

Format
In series one, the programme began with Bailey introducing the show and playing its theme tune, which he performed in a slightly different way in each episode. In subsequent series, the theme tune was, instead, performed by House of Strange Studios of East London. The host/professor and the curator/sidekick introduce themselves. They then give a short guide to the museum, followed by the introduction of the "advisory committee", a guest panel made up of celebrities and academic experts, during which Lloyd reads their CVs aloud.
This introductory section takes up about half the programme.

Then, each member of the "committee" donates something to the museum. The donation can be anything, regardless of its size, cost, tangibility, or even existence. Examples of donations include a yeti, the Battle of Waterloo, and absolutely nothing. Lloyd and the curator then decide what form the exhibit could take and where in the museum it could be displayed. In series one, the programme ended either with Lloyd and Bailey reading audience suggestions for additional exhibits or asking the audience curious questions . Bailey ended the show by giving a humorous comment on a Bertrand Russell quote. Both of these ideas were dropped in series two.

From series two onward, the show has maintained a standard format. It is presented in two-halves; in the first half, Lloyd and the curator introduce the three guests, provide an explanation of who they are, and the five engage in a general discussion. In the second half, the curator declares the Museum open for donations, and each guest explains what they wish to "donate" to the museum (again, as the museum is fictional, nothing is actually exchanged). Questioning of all three guests ensures that everyone says something about each donation.

Production
The programme's pilot episode was recorded on 16 April 2007 and was the entitled The Professor of Curiosity. The guests for this episode were Alastair Fothergill, Victoria Finlay and Simon Munnery. This pilot, recorded at the Rutherford Room at the institute of Physics, has not been broadcast. The first series was recorded at the Pleasance Theatre in Islington and, since then, the show has been recorded at the BBC Radio Theatre, with occasional recordings at other venues, such as the Shaw Theatre and RADA Studios (formerly The Drill Hall), all in London. The series was created by Lloyd, Richard Turner and Dan Schreiber. The show is produced by Anne Miller. The show's researchers are Mike Turner, Lydia Mizon and Emily Jupitus of QI.

A live version of the show was staged at the Natural History Museum, London on 9 November 2012 for charity.  The guests for this edition were Terry Pratchett, Dave Gorman, Alan West, Baron West of Spithead, Helen Keen, Richard Fortey and Erica McAlister. The show was hosted by John Lloyd, with Producer Dan Schreiber taking the role of curator.

Further live shows were staged at the 2014 Edinburgh Fringe featuring a number of top comedians and other guests.

Series 15 and Series 16 were recorded remotely during 2020 and 2021 because of the COVID-19 pandemic.

Episodes

Series 1

Series 2

Series 3

Series 4

Series 5

Series 6

Series 7

Coding Special

Series 8

Series 9

Series 10

Series 11

Series 12

Series 13

Annual Stock Take (2018 Christmas Special)

Series 14

2019 Christmas Special

Series 15

Series 16

Series 17

Reception
Initial reaction to the series was mixed. Phil Daoust in The Guardian described the show as being "unusual" and "eclectic". Chris Campling, who wrote a preview of the first episode, highlighted it in his "Radio Choice" column for The Times. Gillian Reynolds highlighted the programme as one of her radio choices in the Daily Telegraph. Rosanna Chianta in Scotland on Sunday compared the show positively to QI, also created by Lloyd, while Frances Lass from the Radio Times said it was better, claiming it was, "QI with even more jokes. Made me bark with laughter", that, "Lord Reith would be so proud" and the programme was, "Pornography for the brain!"

Miranda Sawyer of The Observer criticised the show, saying that, "it's no QI, because the joy of that programme rests almost entirely in the host, Stephen Fry, and his subversion of the prissy, clever character we're familiar with (in QI, Fry is clever, but relaxed). The Museum of Curiosity is presented partly by Bill Bailey and mostly by John Lloyd, producer of QI (are you getting a theme?). Lloyd may well be a nice chap, but we haven't a clue who he is, and, on the evidence of this, he isn't a big or witty enough character for us to feel desperate to get to know him."

Nicholas Lezard in The Independent on Sunday was lukewarm about the show, saying that the combination of comedian and scientist guests "more or less worked", but he felt the show may not have been greenlit without Lloyd and Bailey's involvement.

Kate Chisholm in The Spectator found the show a welcome change from the "smutty jokes and banal innuendo" usually associated with the timeslot, and compared the series to Paul Merton's Room 101, "but without the ego".

Elisabeth Mahoney in The Guardian was critical of the second series. While praising the discussion between the guests as, "funny and flowing, and quite endearingly quirky", she found that the programme "fizzled away when it reached what ought to have been its crux: the donation of kooky items to the imaginary museum. Instead, we had a reminder of what they were, and then a sudden ending that was both limp and abrupt."

After appearing on the show in series 6, Richard Herring wrote on his blog: "What a delightful and fascinating programme this is (and one that I think might benefit from an extended podcast release – two hours of material is recorded for the 27-minute show and it's pretty much all gold!). At times I was so enjoying listening to the others talking that I almost forgot that I was meant to be taking part. It was a wide-ranging discussion taking in ants on stilts, pianists with crippling, mechanical little fingers, the changing meridian and okapi sex (can you guess what I contributed?). The show has a dedicated team of nerds behind it who have dug out amazing facts and I love the way it has a panel comprising comedians, scientists and experts and attempts to link each contribution to similar areas of the different disciplines. While most TV panel shows (including to some extent even QI) gravitate to putting in the same well-known comedy faces, you get a lot more interesting stuff by mixing it up a bit. The zoologist, Dr Christofer Clemente, came up with the funniest lines of the show. But would they book him on Mock The Week? It's intelligent and stimulating programming that is increasingly being edged out of TV and even radio, leaving a gaping open goal for independent internet productions to score in. I discussed this with one of the razor-minded team after the show. The TV companies insist on getting big names into all shows, which takes up all the budget and seems to ignore the fact that the pool of possible contributors gets smaller and more boring. But glad that a few shows designed to expand the mind rather than crush the spirit still exist."

On 13 September 2016, The Museum of Curiosity won the Rose d'Or in the radio talk show category.

Footnotes

References

External links

2008 radio programme debuts
BBC Radio 4 programmes
BBC Radio comedy programmes
British panel games
2000s British game shows
2010s British game shows
2020s British game shows
Fictional museums
QI